Jack Tupper Daniels (born April 26, 1933) is an exercise physiologist, running coach and a coach of Olympic athletes. On March 21, 2013, he was named the head coach of the Wells College men's and women's cross country programs. He received his doctoral degree in exercise physiology at the University of Wisconsin–Madison. Named "The World's Best Coach" by Runner's World magazine,
he led SUNY Cortland runners to eight NCAA Division III National Championships, 31 individual national titles, and more than 130 All-America awards. Daniels outlined his training philosophies in the 1998 book, Daniels' Running Formula. He mentors and coaches some of America's top distance runners in the country.

Daniels won a team silver medal in the 1956 Summer Olympics and a team bronze medal in the 1960 Summer Olympics for his participation in the modern pentathlon.

VDOT
In the 1970s, Daniels and his colleague, Jimmy Gilbert, examined the performances and known VO2max values of elite middle and long distance runners. Although the laboratory determined VO2max values of these runners may have been different, equally performing runners were assigned equal aerobic profiles. Daniels labeled these "pseudoVO2max" or "effective VO2max" values as VDOT values. According to Daniels, VDOT is a shortened form of V̇O2max, properly stated as "V-dot-O2max".

With the result of a recent competition, a runner can find his or her VDOT value and determine an "equivalent performance" at a different race distance. Given that runners with identical VO2max values may have differences in running economy/efficiency, biomechanics, and mental toughness, Daniels concludes that VDOT is, due to this holistic view, a better value from which to assess fitness and determine training paces.

Training philosophy
Daniels divides running performance into six components. Daniels argues that each of these components requires a specific training intensity to improve.

The Cardiovascular System, specifically the body's ability to transport oxygen.
The Running muscles' ability to use oxygen.
The Lactate threshold - the ability to cope with, and minimize, lactic acid in the blood.
The VO2max - the maximum oxygen uptake capacity.
Speed, for example leg turnover.
The Running economy - the efficiency of the runner's movements.

Training intensities
Daniels uses five specific training intensities to improve the different components above. A runner can determine the correct speed for each intensity based on the VDOT from a recent performance.

Easy / Long (E/L) pace
At 60-79% of maximum heart rate (HRmax), this non-straining intensity is used for recovery runs, warm-up, cool-down and long runs. The primary purpose is to build a base for more intense workouts by strengthening the heart and increasing the muscles' ability to use oxygen, and to recover between hard workouts. Daniels recommends that most training miles are performed in E pace.

Typical E runs include continuous runs up to about an hour.

Marathon (M) pace
At 80-85% HRmax, this intensity is primarily aimed towards runners training for the marathon. The pace is one at which the runner hopes to compete. The pace can be included in other programs for a more intense workout, especially if the runner feels fresh and there is enough time to recover afterwards.

M-runs are performed as continuous runs up to about two hours, or as long interval training.

Threshold (T) pace
At 82-88% HRmax, this intensity is aimed to raise the lactate threshold. The runner should be able to sustain this pace for up to 60 minutes during racing. Daniels describes this intensity as "comfortably hard". In elite runners, the pace matches the half marathon one, while less trained runners will run at around 10k pace. Daniels points out the importance of keeping the given pace to reap the benefits of the training.

T runs are typically performed as continuous "tempo" runs for 20 minutes or more, or as "cruise" interval training with 3 to 10 long bouts of about 3 to 15 minutes each, having 20%-25% rest intervals in between. "T" runs of longer than 20 minutes can be done at slightly reduced pace, according to a table in his book. No more than 10% of the weekly miles should be run at T pace.

Interval (I) pace
Intensity at 97-100% HRmax. This intensity stresses the VO2max to raise the maximum oxygen uptake capacity. Since the pace is very intense, it can only be sustained for up to 12 minutes during racing. To cope with the intensity, and to train for longer periods of time, this training is performed as interval training, hence the name. The interval between each work bout should be a little less than the time of the work bout. Optimum intervals are 3–5 minutes long. There is no benefit to exceeding 5 minutes at this pace, under Daniels' theory, which means that despite the popularity of mile-repeats in many running groups, Daniels discourages them for people whose pace is slower than about 5:00/mile, preferring shorter intervals such as 1200 meters.

For example, an I session can be 6 x 800 m at I pace with 400 m recovery jogs. At most 8% of the weekly training miles should be I pace.

Repetition (R) pace
R pace is very fast training aimed to improve speed and running economy. The training is performed as short interval training, with typically 200 m, 300 m, or 400 m work outs, with full recovery intervals in between. No more than 5% of the weekly miles should be R pace.

Coaching
Daniels was hired as the head coach of the Wells College men's and women's cross country programs on March 21, 2013. Prior to joining the Express, Daniels served as the men's and women's track and field/cross country coach at the State University of New York at Cortland for 17 years while also serving as a physical education professor for the college. Across his coaching career with the Red Dragons, Daniels has coached 30 individual Division III NCAA National Champions, eight NCAA National Team Champions and 130 All-Americans.

Daniels began coaching online in 2008 and is currently part-owner and head coach of The Run SMART Project.

Critique
Tim Noakes has proposed that maximal exercise performance is regulated by a "central governor" rather than a limiting cardiorespiratory function (i.e. VO2 max). Noakes challenges the explanatory power of Daniels' training model (Cardiovascular/Anaerobic) stating that there is a lack of published evidence supporting the claim that each training intensity only improves one of the six physiological components described above. He also states that Daniels' division in components is also not considered complete, e.g. leaving out the muscles' ability to absorb the pounding of running a marathon. But he has acknowledged the efficacy of Daniels' training methods, and stated that science may one day catch up with the explanations, but his methods are effective.

See also
USA Track and Field
U.S. Track & Field and Cross Country Coaches Association

References

External links
 Official VDOT Calculator
 An article on Jack Daniels
 Running Training by Jack Daniels
 Private Coaching with Jack Daniels
 

1933 births
Living people
College track and field coaches in the United States
American male modern pentathletes
Modern pentathletes at the 1956 Summer Olympics
Modern pentathletes at the 1960 Summer Olympics
Olympic silver medalists for the United States in modern pentathlon
Olympic bronze medalists for the United States in modern pentathlon
Exercise physiologists
Medalists at the 1960 Summer Olympics
Medalists at the 1956 Summer Olympics